Wang Zhouzhou (王舟舟, born 20 April 1977) is a male high jumper from PR China. His personal best jump is 2.27 metres, achieved in June 1999 in Shanghai.

Achievements

References

1977 births
Living people
Chinese male high jumpers
Asian Games medalists in athletics (track and field)
Athletes (track and field) at the 2002 Asian Games
Asian Games silver medalists for China
Medalists at the 2002 Asian Games
Competitors at the 2001 Summer Universiade
Competitors at the 2003 Summer Universiade
21st-century Chinese people